Shozhma is a rural locality (a railway station) in Nyandomsky District of Arkhangelsk Oblast, Russia.

History

A prison was established in Shozhma prior to World War II, which existed until 1985. Prisoners were involved in wood production. In 1940–1941, deported people were moved to Shozhma, in particular from the Ukrainian and Estonian SSRs.

Forestry and wood production were dominant in Shozhma during Soviet times. After the dissolution of the Soviet Union, wood production volumes went down considerably and the production nearly stopped at the end of the 20th century, leading to the decline of the local  narrow-gauge railway, which is the only connection with outside world.

External links
Pravda Severa. Шожма, тёзка быстрой реки

References

Rural localities in Nyandomsky District